Diasemia zebralis is a moth in the family Crambidae. It was described by Koen V. N. Maes in 2011. It is found in the Democratic Republic of the Congo.

References

Moths described in 2011
Spilomelinae